Ariela Freedman is a professor at Concordia University, and author of several books.

Freedman was born in Brooklyn, earned her Bachelor's degree at Concordia, returned to New York to earn her PhD at New York University.  She would become the Principal of Concordia's College of Liberal Arts.

Her 2014 book, "Death, Men, and Modernism: Trauma and Narrative in British Fiction from Hardy to Woolf", was a book of literary criticism.  Her book focussed on Thomas Hardy, E.M. Forster, D.H. Lawrence, Ford Maddox Ford, Virginia Woolf and Katherine Mansfield.

Her 2017 book, Arabic for Beginners, was a novel, in spite of the name - an account of woman who joined her husband in Israel, and found a friendship with a Palestinian woman, which triggered her to learn Arabic.  

The Montreal Review of Books described her 2019 book, A Joy to be Hidden, as showing "haunting power".  The book's hero comes of age in grad school, in New York City, in the 1990s.

Freedman has given public lectures on authors who have written about the holocaust, like Molly Applebaum.

References

Academics in Quebec
Year of birth missing (living people)
Living people